Psi Ophiuchi, which is Latinized from ψ Ophiuchi, is a single star in the equatorial constellation of Ophiuchus, next to the western constellation border with Scorpius. It has an orange hue and is visible to the naked eye as a faint point of light with an apparent visual magnitude of 4.50. It is approximately 199 light-years from Earth, based on parallax.

It is an aging giant or bright giant star with a stellar classification of K0- II-III, indicating it has exhausted the supply of hydrogen at its core, then cooled and expanded. It presently has 11 times the girth of the Sun and 1.6 times the Sun's mass. It is a red clump giant, meaning it is on the horizontal branch and is generating energy through core helium fusion. It is radiating 66 times the luminosity of the Sun from its swollen photosphere at an effective temperature of 4,864 K.

References

K-type bright giants
K-type giants
Horizontal-branch stars

Ophiuchus (constellation)
Ophiuchi, Psi
BD-19 4365
Ophiuchi, 04
147700
080343
6104